is a former Japanese football player.

Playing career
Maruyama was born in Machida on October 12, 1974. After graduating from Waseda University, he joined J1 League club Yokohama Marinos (later Yokohama F. Marinos) in 1997. He played center back in 1997 when Masami Ihara and Norio Omura left the club for Japan national team. However he could hardly play in the match from 1998. In 2000, he moved to J2 League club Montedio Yamagata on loan. He played as regular center back. In 2001, he returned to Yokohama F. Marinos. However he could hardly play in the match. In 2002, he moved to J2 club Albirex Niigata. He played as regular center back and the club won the champions in 2003 and was promoted to J1 from 2004. However his opportunity to play decreased for injury from 2004 and he left the club end of 2005 season. After rehabilitation in 6 months, he joined J2 club Vegalta Sendai in July 2006. However he could hardly play in the match for injury. In 2008, he moved to Regional Leagues club AC Nagano Parceiro and played in all matches in 2008 season. In 2009, he moved to Thailand and played for Chonburi (2009) and Thai Port (2010-11). He retired end of 2011 season.

Club statistics

Honours
Clubs
 Kor Royal Cup 2009 Winner with Chonburi FC

References

External links

1974 births
Living people
Waseda University alumni
Association football people from Tokyo
Japanese footballers
J1 League players
J2 League players
Yokohama F. Marinos players
Montedio Yamagata players
Albirex Niigata players
Vegalta Sendai players
AC Nagano Parceiro players
Yoshiaki Maruyama
Expatriate footballers in Thailand
Association football defenders
Japanese football managers
J3 League managers
Cerezo Osaka U-23 managers